Molecular modeling on GPU is the technique of using a graphics processing unit (GPU) for molecular simulations.

In 2007, NVIDIA introduced video cards that could be used not only to show graphics but also for scientific calculations. These cards include many arithmetic units (up to 3,584 in Tesla P100) working in parallel. Long before this event, the computational power of video cards was purely used to accelerate graphics calculations. What was new is that NVIDIA made it possible to develop parallel programs in a high-level application programming interface (API) named CUDA. This technology  substantially simplified programming by enabling programs to be written in C/C++. More recently, OpenCL allows cross-platform GPU acceleration.

Quantum chemistry calculations and molecular mechanics simulations (molecular modeling in terms of classical mechanics) are among beneficial applications of this technology. The video cards can accelerate the calculations tens of times, so a PC with such a card has the power similar to that of a cluster of workstations based on common processors.

GPU accelerated molecular modelling software

Programs
Abalone – Molecular Dynamics (Benchmark)
ACEMD on GPUs since 2009 Benchmark
AMBER on GPUs version
Ascalaph on GPUs version – Ascalaph Liquid GPU
AutoDock – Molecular docking
BigDFT Ab initio program based on wavelet
BrianQC Quantum chemistry (HF and DFT) and molecular mechanics
Blaze ligand-based virtual screening
CP2K Ab initio molecular dynamics
Desmond (software) on GPUs, workstations, and clusters
Firefly (formerly PC GAMESS)
FastROCS
GOMC – GPU Optimized Monte Carlo simulation engine
GPIUTMD – Graphical processors for Many-Particle Dynamics
GPUMD - A light weight general-purpose molecular dynamics code
GROMACS on GPUs 
HALMD – Highly Accelerated Large-scale MD package
HOOMD-blue  – Highly Optimized Object-oriented Many-particle Dynamics—Blue Edition
LAMMPS on GPUs version – lammps for accelerators
LIO DFT-Based GPU optimized code - 
Octopus has support for OpenCL.
oxDNA – DNA and RNA coarse-grained simulations on GPUs
PWmat – Plane-Wave Density Functional Theory simulations
RUMD - Roskilde University Molecular Dynamics
TeraChem – Quantum chemistry and ab initio Molecular Dynamics
TINKER on GPUs. 
VMD & NAMD  on GPUs versions
YASARA runs MD simulations on all GPUs using OpenCL.

API
BrianQC – has an open C level API for quantum chemistry simulations on GPUs, provides GPU-accelerated version of Q-Chem and PSI
OpenMM – an API for accelerating molecular dynamics on GPUs, v1.0 provides GPU-accelerated version of GROMACS
mdcore – an open-source platform-independent library for molecular dynamics simulations on modern shared-memory parallel architectures.

Distributed computing projects
GPUGRID distributed supercomputing infrastructure
Folding@home distributed computing project

See also

References

External links 
More links for classical and quantum сhemistry on GPUs

Molecular modelling
Computational chemistry
Molecular dynamics
Chemistry software
GPGPU